Allan Scott (May 23, 1906 – April 13, 1995) was a screenwriter who was nominated for an Academy Award for So Proudly We Hail!.

Career 
He co-wrote the screenplays for a number of Fred Astaire and Ginger Rogers films: Top Hat (1935), Follow the Fleet (1936), Swing Time (1936), Shall We Dance (1937), and Carefree (1938), as well as Roberta (1935), in which they played supporting roles.

Filmography
As screenwriter, unless otherwise noted.

 Goodbye Again (1933) (play)
 Let's Try Again (1934) (uncredited)
 By Your Leave (1934)
 Roberta (1935)
 Village Tale (1935)
 Top Hat (1935)
 In Person (1935)
 I Dream Too Much (1935) (uncredited add. dialogue)
 Follow the Fleet (1936)
 Swing Time (1936)
 Quality Street (1937)
 Shall We Dance (1937)
 Wise Girl (1937) (also story)
 Joy of Living (1938)
 Carefree (1938) (also uncredited minor acting role)
 Man About Town (1939)
 5th Ave Girl (1939)
 Primrose Path (1940)
 Lucky Partners (1940)
 Honeymoon for Three (1941) (play)
 Sun Valley Serenade (1941) (uncredited contributing writer)
 Skylark (1941)
 Remember the Day (1941)
 So Proudly We Hail! (1943)
 I Love a Soldier (1944)
 Here Come the Waves (1944)
 Blue Skies (1946) (adaptation)
 Let's Dance (1950)
 The Guy Who Came Back (1951)
 Wait till the Sun Shines, Nellie (1952) (adaptation)
 The Four Poster (1952)
 The 5,000 Fingers of Dr. T (1953)
 Top Secret Affair (1957)
 Quick, Let's Get Married (1964) (Daughter Pippa Scott appears)

Personal life 
Allan was the father of actor Pippa Scott and brother of film producer and screenwriter Adrian Scott. He died on 13 April 1995 at St. John's Health Center in Santa Monica, California, at aged 88.

References

External links

1906 births
1995 deaths
American male screenwriters
People from Kearny, New Jersey
Screenwriters from New Jersey
20th-century American male writers
20th-century American screenwriters